is a Japanese kickboxer, currently competing in the super bantamweight division of K-1. A professional competitor since 2016, Kaneko is the current K-1 Super Bantamweight champion and the former Krush Bantamweight champion, having held the title from June to December 2018.

As of March 2022, he is the #2 ranked flyweight by Combat Press, and has been ranked in the flyweight top ten since September 2020. He was ranked in the strawweight top ten by Combat Press between May 2019 and August 2020.

Kickboxing career

Bantamweight career

Early career
Kaneko made his professional debut against Fumiya Hata at Krush 69 on September 30, 2016. He won the fight by a third-round knockout, flooring Hata with a knee to the body, which left him unable to beat the ten count.

Kaneko was scheduled to fight Koki at Krush 72 on January 15, 2017. He won the fight by a third-round knockout. Kaneko dropped Koki with a short left hook early in the third round, before finishing him with a second left hook at the 2:00 minute mark of the last round.

Kaneko faced Naoya Otada at Krush 75 on April 2, 2017. He won the fight by unanimous decision, with all three judges scoring the bout 30–29 in his favor.

Kaneko was scheduled to face Naota Yamada at Krush 77 on July 16, 2017. He won the fight by a second-round knockout.

In his fifth professional fight, Kaneko faced the former BigBang Super Bantamweight champion Taisuke Degai at Krush 82 on November 5, 2017. He won the fight by unanimous decision, with scores of 30–28, 30-28 and 29–28.

Krush Bantamweight champion
Kaneko was scheduled to challenge the reigning Krush Bantamweight champion Taito Gunji in the co-main event of Krush 89 on June 30, 2018. It was Gunji's first title defense and Kaneko's first major title fight. The fight was ruled a draw, following the first three rounds. The first judge scored the fight 29–28 for Taito, the second judge scored the fight 29–28 for Kaneko, while the third judge scred the fight as an even 29–29 draw. Accordingly, an extension round was fought, which Kaneko won by unanimous decision, with all three judges scoring the fight 10–8 in his favor.

Kaneko made his first title defense against the WPMF bantamweight champion Junya Weerasakreck at Krush 94 on October 28, 2018. He won the fight by a second-round knockout, dropping Junya with a well placed knee to the body. On December 18, 2018, Kaneko vacated the title, as he moved up in weight to super bantamweight.

Move up to super bantamweight
Kaneko was scheduled to fight Shuhei Kumura at K-1's flagship event K’FESTA 2 on March 10, 2019. The fight was ruled a draw, after the first three rounds were contested, with all three judges scoring the fight an even 29–29. Kaneko had knocked Kumura down once in the second round, but was himself knocked down twice in the second round as well. Kaneko was awarded the unanimous decision after an extra fourth round was fought, with all three judges scoring the fight 10–9 for Kaneko. It was later revealed that Kaneko had suffered a broken hand during the bout.

Kaneko faced Yuta Hayashi at Krush 104 on August 31, 2019. He won the fight by unanimous decision, with scores of 30–28, 30-29 and 30–28.

Kaneko fought the reigning Krush Super Bantamweight champion Masashi Kumura at K-1 World GP 2020: K’Festa 3 on March 22, 2020. Kumura handed Kanko his first professional loss, winning the fight by majority decision, with scores of 30–29, 30-30 and 30–28.

Kaneko was scheduled to fight Momotaro Kiyama at K-1 World GP 2021: K’Festa 4 Day.2 on March 28, 2021. The fight came a year after his loss to Kumura. They were originally scheduled to fight at K-1: K’Festa 4 on January 24, 2021, before the fight was postponed due to the COVID-19 restrictions. Kaneko won the fight by a third-round technical knockout. He knocked Kiyama down in the third minute of the round, after which Kiyama's corner threw in the towel. During the post-fight interview, Kaneko stated his desire to fight for the vacant K-1 Super Bantamweight title.

Kaneko was scheduled to face the former Krush Bantamweight champion Koki at K-1 World GP 2021: Yokohamatsuri on September 20, 2021. The two of them previously fought at Krush.72 on January 15, 2017, with Kaneko winning by a third-round knockout. Kaneko won the fight by a first-round technical knockout. He completely dominated the bout, successfully dropping Koki three times by the 2:35 minute mark the first round.

K-1 super bantamweight champion

Super bantamweight Grand Prix
On February 27, 2022, K-1 announced that Kaneko would be one of eight participants in the 2022 Super Bantamweight World Grand Prix, which was held at K-1 World GP 2022 Japan on February 27, 2022. Kaneko faced Yuto Kuroda in the tournament quarterfinals. He won the fight by a third-round knockout. Kaneko first knocked Kuroda down with a counter left hook early in the last round of the bout, before knocking him out with a right straight at the 2:17 minute mark of the third round.

Kaneko advanced to the tournament semifinals, where he faced the reigning Krush Super Bantamweight (-55kg) champion Riamu Sera. He was awarded the automatic technical knockout victory, after knocking Riamu down twice by the 2:23 minute mark. Kaneko first knocked Riamu down with a short left hook, before knocking him down a second time with a low kick. Kaneko faced Masashi Kumura in the finals of the one-day tournament. The bout was a rematch of their March 22, 2020 meeting, which Kumura won by majority decision. Kaneko was more successful in the rematch, winning the fight by majority decision. He knocked Kumura down with a combination of punches in the second round, which proved the pivotal moment of the fight, as it edged the scorecards in his favor.

Title reign
Kaneko was booked to face the reigning RISE Bantamweight champion Masahiko Suzuki in a non-title bout on June 19, 2022. The bout was scheduled for the undercard of The Match 2022, a RISE and K-1 cross-promotional event, headlined by Takeru Segawa and Tenshin Nasukawa. The event was broadcast by Abema TV as a pay per view. He failed to successfully implement his patented pressure game and lost the fight by majority decision. Two of the judges scored the fight 30–28 and 30–29 for Suzuki, while the third judge scored the bout as an even 29–29 draw.

Kaneko faced Jordan Swinton, the first foreign opponent of his professional career, at K-1 World GP 2022 Yokohamatsuri on September 11, 2022. He won the fight by technical knockout 40 seconds into the opening round. Kaneko knocked Swinton down with a right straight as soon as the bout started, before flooring him with a strike to the body, which left his opponent unable to rise from the canvas. Kaneko next faced Kiriluang Chor.Hapayak at K-1 World GP 2022 in Osaka on December 3, 2022. HE won the fight by a third-round knockout.

Kaneko made his first K-1 Super Bantamweight Championship defense against the former two-weight Lumpinee Boxing Stadium champion Kompetch Sitsarawatsuer at K-1 World GP 2023: K'Festa 6 on March 12, 2023. He won the fight by majority decision, with scores of 30–29, 30–28 and 30–30. During the in-ring post-fight interview, Kaneko called for a trilogy bout with Masashi Kumura.

Titles and accomplishments

Professional
Krush
2018 Krush Bantamweight (-53kg) Champion (One successful defense)

K-1
 2022 K-1 Super Bantamweight World Grand Prix Winner
 2022 K-1 World GP Super Bantamweight (-55kg) Champion

Amateur
2016 K-1 All Japan A-Class -55 kg Champion & event MVP
2018 K-1 Awards Rookie of the Year
2022 K-1 Awards Fight of the Year

Fight record

|- style="background:#cfc;"
| 2023-03-12 || Win||align=left| Kompetch Sitsarawatsuer || K-1 World GP 2023: K'Festa 6 || Tokyo, Japan ||   Decision (Majority)||3 ||3:00 
|-
! style=background:white colspan=9 |
|-
|-  style="text-align:center; background:#cfc"
| 2022-12-03 || Win ||align=left| Kiriluang Chor.Hapayak ||  K-1 World GP 2022 in Osaka || Osaka, Japan || KO (Left hook) || 3 || 2:38
|-  style="text-align:center; background:#cfc"
| 2022-09-11 || Win || align=left| Jordan Swinton||  K-1 World GP 2022 Yokohamatsuri  || Yokohama, Japan || KO (Right straight to the body) || 1 || 0:40
|-  style="text-align:center; background:#fbb"
| 2022-06-19 || Loss ||align=left| Masahiko Suzuki || THE MATCH 2022 || Tokyo, Japan || Decision (Majority)|| 3 ||3:00
|- style="background:#cfc"
| 2022-02-27|| Win ||align=left| Masashi Kumura||  K-1 World GP 2022 Japan, Super Bantamweight GP Final || Tokyo, Japan || Decision (Majority)  || 3 ||3:00  
|-
! style=background:white colspan=9 |

|- style="background:#cfc"
| 2022-02-27|| Win ||align=left| Riamu||  K-1 World GP 2022 Japan, Super Bantamweight GP Semi Finals || Tokyo, Japan || TKO (2 Knockdown/Low kick)  || 2 ||2:23  
|- style="background:#cfc"
| 2022-02-27|| Win ||align=left| Yuto Kuroda  ||  K-1 World GP 2022 Japan, Super Bantamweight GP Quarter Finals || Tokyo, Japan || KO (Right cross)  || 3 || 2:17  
|-
|-  style="text-align:center; background:#cfc;"
| 2021-09-20 || Win ||align=left| Koki || K-1 World GP 2021: Yokohamatsuri || Yokohama, Japan || TKO (Three knockdowns)  || 1 || 2:35
|-  style="text-align:center; background:#cfc;"
| 2021-03-28|| Win ||align=left| Momotaro Kiyama || K-1 World GP 2021: K’Festa 4 Day.2 || Tokyo, Japan || TKO (Corner Stoppage) || 3 || 2:36
|-  style="text-align:center; background:#fbb;"
| 2020-03-22|| Loss ||align=left| Masashi Kumura || K-1 World GP 2020: K’Festa 3 || Saitama, Japan || Decision (Majority)|| 3|| 3:00
|-  style="text-align:center; background:#CCFFCC;"
| 2019-08-31|| Win ||align=left| Yuta Hayashi || Krush 104 || Tokyo, Japan || Decision (Unanimous) || 3 || 3:00
|-  style="text-align:center; background:#CCFFCC;"
| 2019-03-10|| Win ||align=left| Shuhei Kumura || K-1 World GP 2019: K’FESTA 2 || Saitama, Japan || Ext.R Decision (Unanimous) || 4 || 3:00
|-  style="text-align:center; background:#CCFFCC;"
| 2018-10-28|| Win ||align=left| Junya Weerasakreck || Krush.94 || Tokyo, Japan || KO (Right Knee to the body) || 2 || 2:20
|-
! style=background:white colspan=9 |
|-  style="text-align:center; background:#CCFFCC;"
| 2018-06-30|| Win ||align=left| Taito Gunji || Krush.89 || Tokyo, Japan || Ext.R Decision (Unanimous)   || 4 || 3:00
|-
! style=background:white colspan=9 |
|-  style="text-align:center; background:#CCFFCC;"
| 2017-11-05|| Win ||align=left| Taisuke Degai || Krush.82 || Tokyo, Japan || Decision (Unanimous)|| 3 || 3:00
|-  style="text-align:center; background:#CCFFCC;"
| 2017-07-16|| Win ||align=left| Naota Yamada || Krush.77 || Tokyo, Japan || KO (Right hook)|| 2 || 1:00
|-  style="text-align:center; background:#CCFFCC;"
| 2017-04-02|| Win ||align=left| Naoya Otada || Krush.75 || Tokyo, Japan || Decision (Unanimous)|| 3 || 3:00
|-  style="text-align:center; background:#CCFFCC;"
| 2017-01-15|| Win ||align=left| Koki || Krush.72 || Tokyo, Japan || KO (Left Hook)|| 3 || 2:00
|-  style="text-align:center; background:#CCFFCC;"
| 2016-09-30|| Win ||align=left| Fumiya Hata || Krush.69 || Tokyo, Japan || KO (High Knee)|| 3 || 1:36
|-
|-
| colspan=9 | Legend:    

|-  style="background:#CCFFCC;"
| 2016-05-22|| Win ||align=left| Naoya Otada || K-1 Amateur All Japan A-Class -55 kg Tournament, Final || Tokyo, Japan ||  KO || 1||
|-
! style=background:white colspan=9 |
|-  style="background:#CCFFCC;"
| 2016-05-22|| Win ||align=left| Retsu Akabane || K-1 Amateur All Japan A-Class -55 kg Tournament, Semi Final || Tokyo, Japan ||  Extra Round Decision || 2|| 2:00
|-  style="background:#CCFFCC;"
| 2015-12-06|| Win ||align=left| Hisashi Fukushima || K-1 Amateur Challenge B-Class -55 kg Tournament, Final || Tokyo, Japan ||  Decision (Majority) || 2|| 2:00
|-
! style=background:white colspan=9 |
|-  style="background:#CCFFCC;"
| 2015-12-06|| Win ||align=left| Keisuke Takanashi || K-1 Amateur Challenge B-Class -55 kg Tournament, Semi Final || Tokyo, Japan ||  KO || 1||
|-  style="background:#CCFFCC;"
| 2015-09-06|| Win ||align=left| Hiroki Tsuruta || J-Fight 44 || Tokyo, Japan ||Decision|| 2 || 2:00
|-  style="background:#CCFFCC;"
| 2014-12-07|| Win ||align=left| Yasuhiro Suzuki || K-1 Challenge 2014 B-Class, Final || Tokyo, Japan ||Decision|| 2 || 2:00
|-
! style=background:white colspan=9 |
|-  style="background:#CCFFCC;"
| 2014-12-07|| Win ||align=left| Yuta Ohno || K-1 Challenge 2014 B-Class, Semi Final || Tokyo, Japan ||Decision|| 1 || 2:00
|-  style="background:#CCFFCC;"
| 2014-12-07|| Win ||align=left| Kento Yoshida || K-1 Challenge 2014 B-Class, Quarter Final || Tokyo, Japan ||Decision|| 1 || 2:00
|-  style="background:#FFBBBB;"
| 2014-10-19|| Loss ||align=left| Taito Gunji || K-1 Challenge 2014 B-Class, Final || Tokyo, Japan || Decision|| 1 || 2:00
|-
! style=background:white colspan=9 |
|-  style="background:#CCFFCC;"
| 2014-10-19|| Win ||align=left| Yasuhiro Suzuki || K-1 Challenge 2014 B-Class, Semi Final || Tokyo, Japan || Extra Round Decision|| 2 || 2:00
|-  style="background:#CCFFCC;"
| 2014-10-19|| Win ||align=left| Issei Ichiki || K-1 Challenge 2014 B-Class, Quarter Final || Tokyo, Japan || Extra Round Decision|| 2 || 2:00
|-  style="background:#CCFFCC;"
| 2014-07-06|| Win ||align=left| Ryuto Watanabe || JAKF SMASHERS 166 || Tokyo, Japan || Decision (Unanimous)|| 2 || 2:00
|-  style="background:#CCFFCC;"
| 2014-06-01|| Win ||align=left| Tasuku Sugita || JAKF SMASHERS 165, Final || Tokyo, Japan || Decision|| 2 || 2:00
|-
! style=background:white colspan=9 |
|-  style="background:#CCFFCC;"
| 2014-06-01|| Win ||align=left| Hitoshi Tanaka || JAKF SMASHERS 165, Semi Final || Tokyo, Japan || Decision|| 2 || 2:00
|-  style="background:#CCFFCC;"
| 2014-05-18|| Win ||align=left| Masaya Kobayashi || JAKF SMASHERS 164 || Tokyo, Japan || KO || 2 ||
|-
| colspan=9 | Legend:

See also
 List of male kickboxers
 List of Krush champions

References

Living people
1997 births
Japanese male kickboxers
Sportspeople from Chiba Prefecture
Flyweight kickboxers
People from Narashino